Nichols Ridge is a rock ridge between Denton Glacier and Decker Glacier in east Asgard Range, Victoria Land. The feature descends from heights north of Mount Newall to the snout of Wright Lower Glacier at the east end of Wright Valley. Named by Advisory Committee on Antarctic Names (US-ACAN) (1997) after Robert L. Nichols (Nichols Snowfield), one of the first American scientists to do geologic research in Wright Valley. In 1958, he found pecten deposits near the middle of the valley that greatly heightened research to determine the origin of the deposits and the glacial history of Wright Valley. This ridge is in proximity to Meserve, Hart, Goodspeed, and Denton Glaciers, named after four young geologists who worked in this area under Nichols in the 1958-59 field season.

Ridges of Victoria Land
McMurdo Dry Valleys